Sheldon Point Airport  is a state-owned public-use airport located in Nunam Iqua (formerly Sheldon Point), a city in the Kusilvak Census Area of the U.S. state of Alaska. FAA records still list the location as Sheldon Point, but the city was renamed Nunam Iqua in 1999.

Facilities 
 Runway 1/19: 3,015 x 60 ft (919 x 18 m), surface: gravel
 Runway 9W/27W: 15,000 x 2,000 ft (4,572 x 610 m), surface: water
 Runway 18W/36W: 15,000 x 2,000 ft (4,572 x 610 m), surface: water

Airlines and destinations 

Prior to its bankruptcy and cessation of all operations, Ravn Alaska served the airport from multiple locations.

Top destinations

References

External links 
 FAA Alaska airport diagram (GIF)
 Resources for this airport:
 
 
 

Airports in the Kusilvak Census Area, Alaska